Martine-Michèle Sebag is a French computer scientist, primarily focused on machine learning. She has over 6,000 citations.

Biography
Sebag studied mathematics at the Ecole Normale Supérieure, and later worked in the computer science industry, starting at Thomson Corporation, where she was introduced to artificial intelligence. She then moved into the research field, at the Laboratoire de Mécanique des Solides at Ecole Polytechnique.

She was awarded a PhD from the University of Paris-Sud, Paris Dauphine University and Ecole Polytechnique. Sebag started work at the Centre national de la recherche scientifique (CNRS) as a research fellow in 1991.

Sebag is deputy director of the Laboratoire de Recherche en Informatique at the CNRS; Head of group A-O at the latter; co-head of Projet TAO at INRIA Saclay; and principal scientist at the CNRS.

She was named chevalier of the Légion d'honneur in 2019.

Selected research
Gelly, Sylvain, et al. "The grand challenge of computer Go: Monte Carlo tree search and extensions." Communications of the ACM 55.3 (2012): 106-113.
Bordes, Antoine, Léon Bottou, and Patrick Gallinari. "SGD-QN: Careful quasi-Newton stochastic gradient descent." Journal of Machine Learning Research 10.Jul (2009): 1737-1754.
Termier, Alexandre, M-C. Rousset, and Michèle Sebag. "Treefinder: a first step towards xml data mining." 2002 IEEE International Conference on Data Mining, 2002. Proceedings.. IEEE, 2002.
Sebag, Michèle, and Antoine Ducoulombier. "Extending population-based incremental learning to continuous search spaces." International Conference on Parallel Problem Solving from Nature. Springer, Berlin, Heidelberg, 1998.

Further reading
José L. Balcázar; Francesco Bonchi; Aristides Gionis; 2010. Machine Learning and Knowledge Discovery in Databases: European Conference, ECML PKDD 2010, Barcelona, Spain, September 20–24, 2010. Proceedings. Springer. .

References

External links
article by Sebag in Le Monde

Living people
French women computer scientists
Écoles Normales Supérieures
University of Paris alumni
Chevaliers of the Légion d'honneur
Year of birth missing (living people)
Date of birth missing (living people)
Place of birth missing (living people)
Research directors of the French National Centre for Scientific Research